is a broadcasting station in Miyazaki Prefecture, Japan, and it is affiliated with JRN, NRN (radio) and JNN (TV).  It is owned by the government of the prefecture, Mainichi Shimbun, the Bank of Miyazaki and various investors with fewers stocks. 

The name MRT comes from Miyazaki Radio and Television, the name was adopted in 1961 upon changing from RMK (Radio Miyazaki K.K.). MRT commences radio broadcasting in 1954,  and started television broadcasting in 1959.  On December 2006, MRT started digital terrestrial television broadcasting.

Station

Radio
Fukuoka: 936 kHz JONF 5 kW; 90.4 MHz FM

TV (Analog)
Fukuoka: Channel 10 JONF-TV
Nobeoka: Channel 6
Iino: Channel 6
Kushima: Channel 1
Takachiho: Channel 5

TV (Digital)
Button 6
Miyazaki: Channel 15 JONF-DTV

References

External links 
 MRT宮崎放送
 miten
 MRT宮崎放送 - YouTube
 

Japan News Network
Television stations in Japan
Radio in Japan
Radio stations established in 1954
Television channels and stations established in 1960
Mass media in Miyazaki (city)